I. polymorpha may refer to:

 Iguanura polymorpha, a Southeast Asian palm
 Ipomoea polymorpha, a morning glory
 Iresine polymorpha, an amaranth native to the American tropics